Diego Gómez may refer to:

Sportspeople
 Diego Gómez (Colombian footballer) (born 1972), retired Colombian football goalkeeper
 Diego Gómez (footballer, born 1984), retired Argentine football forward
 Diego Gómez (Spanish footballer) (born 1990), Spanish football goalkeeper
 Diego Gómez (Mexican footballer) (born 2003), Mexican football attacking midfielder for Necaxa
 Diego Gómez (Paraguayan footballer) (born 2003), Paraguayan football midfielder for Club Libertad

Other uses
 Diego Gómez de Lamadrid (1529–1601), Spanish archbishop
 Diego Gómez (journalist) (1936–2021), Spanish journalist
 Diego Gómez Pickering (born 1977), Mexican diplomat and writer
 Diego Gómez, a Wikimedian, see Wikimedian of the Year#Honorable mentions

See also
 Diogo Gomes (c. 1420–c. 1500), Portuguese navigator, explorer and writer
 Diogo Gomes (footballer, born 1985)
 Diogo Gomes (footballer, born 2000)